Pallab Kirtania (born 14 Augr 1964) is an Indian Bengali male singer-songwriter, writer and actor from Kolkata.

Education
He received his education at Katiahat BKAP Institution, after which he attended Medical College and Hospital, Kolkata.

Music Album
 Shaon
 Ghumer Pata
 Dhulokhela
 Muktobeni

Books
 Ganer Mati (Abhijan Publishers, 2012)
 Patar Porijon (Abhijan Publishers, 2013)
 Patar Canvas (Abhijan Publishers, 2014)

References
 
 http://article.wn.com/view/2014/04/26/Pallab_Kirtania_debuts_in_Tollywood/

External links

  http://mio.to/album/66-Bengali_Rabindra_Sangeet/236665-Muktobeni/#/album/66-Bengali_Rabindra_Sangeet/236665-Muktobeni/
 http://www.musickolkata.com/artist/profile/712/pallab_kirtania

1964 births
Living people
Male actors in Bengali cinema
Singers from Kolkata
Bengali singers
Indian male singer-songwriters
Indian singer-songwriters
Medical College and Hospital, Kolkata